The 2001–02 Angola Basketball Cup was a basketball competition held by the Taça de Angola from December 18 to December 22, 2001.

2002 Men's Basketball Cup
The 2002 Men's Basketball Cup final was contested by Primeiro de Agosto and Petro Atlético with Primeiro winning the trophy by beating Petro 91-75.

2002 Women's Basketball Cup
The 2002 Women's Basketball Cup was contested by four teams in a round robin system with a playoff match between the two top teams. The final, on December 22, 2001 was played by Primeiro de Agosto and Desportivo do Maculusso.

Preliminary rounds

Final

See also
 2002 Angola Basketball Super Cup
 2002 BAI Basket

References

Angola Basketball Cup seasons
Cup